The Fountain of Arethusa is a natural fountain on the island of Ortygia in the historical centre of the city of Syracuse in Sicily. According to Greek mythology, the fresh water fountain is the place where the nymph Arethusa, the patron figure of ancient Syracuse, returned to earth's surface after escaping from her undersea home in Arcadia.

The fountain is mentioned in a number of works of literature, for instance John Milton’s pastoral elegy Lycidas (l. 85) and his masque Arcades, as well as Alexander Pope’s satire The Dunciad (Bk 2, l. 342) and William Wordsworth's blank verse poem The Prelude (Bk X, l. 1033). These writers would have known the fountain from references in ancient Roman and Greek sources, such as Virgil's 10th Eclogue (l. 1) and Theocritus' pastoral poem Idylls (I, l. 117). Virgil reckons the eponymous nymph as the divinity who inspired bucolic or pastoral poetry. In Moby-Dick, Herman Melville writes that waters from the fountain were said to come from the Holy Land.

The Fountain of Arethusa, the river Ciane, south of Syracuse, and the river Fiume Freddo in the province of Catania are the only places in Europe where papyrus grows.

References

 Guerber, Hélène Adeline Myths of Greece and Rome, Narrated with Special Reference to Literature and Art
 A dictionary of Greek and Roman biography and mythology (1880)

External links
 The Arethusa Fountain of Syracuse

Ancient Syracuse
Buildings and structures in Syracuse, Sicily
Fountains in Italy
Springs of Italy